The square root of 3 is the positive real number that, when multiplied by itself, gives the number 3. It is more precisely called the principal square root of 3 to distinguish it from the negative number with the same property. The square root of 3 is an irrational number. It is also known as Theodorus' constant, after Theodorus of Cyrene, who proved its irrationality.

, its numerical value in decimal notation had been computed to at least ten billion digits. Its decimal expansion, written here to 65 decimal places, is given by :

The fraction  (...) can be used as a good approximation.

Archimedes reported a range for its value: . 

Expressions

It can be expressed as the continued fraction  .

So it is true to say:

then when  :

It can also be expressed by generalized continued fractions such as

which is  evaluated at every second term.

Geometry and trigonometry

The square root of 3 can be found as the leg length of an equilateral triangle that encompasses a circle with a diameter of 1.

The square root of 3 also appears in algebraic expressions for various other trigonometric constants, including the sines of 3°, 12°, 15°, 21°, 24°, 33°, 39°, 48°, 51°, 57°, 66°, 69°, 75°, 78°, 84°, and 87°.

It is the distance between parallel sides of a regular hexagon with sides of length 1.

It is the length of the space diagonal of a unit cube.

This can be shown by constructing two equilateral triangles within it.

Other uses and occurrence

Power engineering

In power engineering, the voltage between two phases in a three-phase system equals  times the line to neutral voltage. This is because any two phases are 120° apart, and two points on a circle 120 degrees apart are separated by  times the radius (see geometry examples above).

Special functions

See also

 Square root of 2
 Square root of 5

Other references

References

External links

 Theodorus' Constant at MathWorld
 Kevin Brown
 E. B. Davis

Quadratic irrational numbers
Mathematical constants